Mariya Stepanovna Gambaryan (Yerevan, 1 October 1925) is an Armenian pianist.

She studied until 1948 in the Leningrad Conservatory under Konstantin Igumnov, who took pride in shaping her artistic personality, followed by postgraduate studies in the Moscow Conservatory under Heinrich Neuhaus and Lev Oborin. She taught in the Leningrad Conservatory from 1956, and in the Gnessin College after moving to Moscow in 1960. There she taught for most of her life, until 2017. She received the Honored Artist of the Armenian RSS and the Russian Federation medals in 1966 and 2005 respectively, as well as the Movses Khorenatsi medal in 2016.

Premieres

References

1925 births
People from Yerevan
Armenian classical pianists
Saint Petersburg Conservatory alumni
Academic staff of Saint Petersburg Conservatory
Living people